Search for Treasure Island is an Australian TV series that aired in 1998 and 2000. It revolves around a group of people finding the mysterious Treasure Island. The protagonists encounter many cultures, factions and obstacles on the island as they try to find their parents and escape the ominous Maelstrom.

Episodes

Season 1 (1998)
 The Empty Ocean (Aug 17, 1998)
 Shipwrecked (Aug 18, 1998) 
 Lost in Time (Aug 19, 1998)
 No Escape (Aug 20, 1998) 
 Bride of the Horselord (Aug 24, 1998) 
 The Old Ones (Aug 25, 1998)
 Spyglass Hill (Aug 26, 1998) 
 Pirate Gold (Aug 27, 1998) 
 Fortress of the Damned (Aug 31, 1998) 
 The Mountains of Fire (Sep 1, 1998) 
 Dante's Lair (Sep 2, 1998) 
 Secret of the Stone Circle (Sep 3, 1998)

Season 2 (2000)
 (13) Ghosts and Demons (Apr 11, 2000)
 (14) A Thief in the Night (Apr 12, 2000) 
 (15) Stormers (Apr 13, 2000) 
 (16) Thorn Birds (Apr 17, 2000) 
 (17) A Snake in the Grass (Apr 18, 2000) 
 (18) Curse of Thunder Cove (Apr 19, 2000)
 (19) Brotherhood (April 20, 2000)
 (20) Dead Man's Chest (April 25, 2000) 
 (21) Pirate Treachery (April 26, 2000)
 (22) Computer Games (April 27, 2000) 
 (23) Damsel in Distress (May 1, 2000)
 (24) Dante in Darkness (May 2, 2000)
 (25) Flints Curse (May 3, 2000)
 (26) Eye of the Storm (May 4, 2000)

External links
Search for Treasure Island at IMDb
Search for Treasure Island at Australian Television

Australian children's television series
1998 Australian television series debuts
2000 Australian television series endings
Television series based on Treasure Island
English-language television shows